The Institute of Chemistry PNG is the professional organisation supporting chemical sciences in Papua New Guinea and a learned society promoting the science and practice of chemistry.

Affiliations
The Institute of Chemistry PNG is a member of the Federation of Asian Chemical Societies (FACS).

Journal of the Institute of Chemists PNG
The Institute publishes the Journal of the Institute of Chemists PNG, with the second volume published in 2009.

References

Chemistry societies
Chemistry education
Scientific organisations based in Papua New Guinea